Plavis may refer to:
 Piave River, in Italy (Latin name)
Meldin, a polymer